Disneytoon Studios (DTS), originally named Disney MovieToons and also formerly Walt Disney Video Premieres, was an American animation studio which created direct-to-video and occasional theatrical animated feature films. The studio was a division of Walt Disney Animation Studios, with both being part of The Walt Disney Studios, itself a division of The Walt Disney Company. The studio produced 47 feature films, beginning with DuckTales the Movie: Treasure of the Lost Lamp in 1990. Its final feature film was Tinker Bell and the Legend of the NeverBeast in 2015.

History

Disney MovieToons/Walt Disney Video Premieres

Disney MovieToons' first feature production was DuckTales the Movie: Treasure of the Lost Lamp in 1990, with animation by Walt Disney Animation France. Disney Television Animation hired director of specials, Sharon Morrill, in 1993.

Disney began producing direct-to-video (DTV) sequels of Walt Disney Feature Animation films: the first of which was the Aladdin (1992) sequel The Return of Jafar (1994).  When Aladdin was selected as a possible candidate as an animated TV series (before the film's release), as with many animated series, the first three episodes were a multi-part story which Disney used as a potential "family movie special" for the Friday night before the series' premiere. The opening story was instead greenlit for a direct-to-video release. Thus with The Return of Jafar and its success, the direct-to-video unit was started. Then a second sequel, Aladdin and the King of Thieves (1996), assigned work to both the Australian and Japanese animation units.

In August 1994 with the departure of Walt Disney Studios chairman Jeffrey Katzenberg, its filmed entertainment business was split into two, with this division moved as a part of Walt Disney Television Animation into the newly created Walt Disney Television and Telecommunications under chairman Richard H. Frank.

Morrill was in charge of the above first Aladdin DTV film, launching Disney Video Premiere. Morrill expanded the DTV market making it more important for Disney, thus the overseas Disney studios were increased and assigned to these features. Morrill was promoted to vice president of the direct-to-video unit by November 1997.

The Walt Disney Television group, upon the departure of its president Dean Valentine in September 1997, was split into two units, Walt Disney Television (WDT) and Walt Disney Network Television (WDNT), reporting to Walt Disney Studios chairman Joe Roth. WDT would be headed by Charles Hirschhorn as president and consisted of Disney Telefilms and Walt Disney Television Animation, which included including Disney MovieToons and Disney Video Premiere.

The unit released a short under the WDTA name in 1997, Redux Riding Hood, which was nominated for a 1998 Academy Award. More direct-to-video sequels followed, among them Beauty and the Beast: The Enchanted Christmas (1997), Pocahontas II: Journey to a New World (1998), The Lion King II: Simba's Pride (1998), The Little Mermaid II: Return to the Sea (2000) and Cinderella II: Dreams Come True (2002). By April 1998, MovieToons was merged with the units of direct-to-video films and network TV specials as Morrill was promoted to executive vice president over her existing unit of DTV films, network TV specials and theatrical films. Ellen Gurney was promoted from director of DTV films, theatrical movies and specials to vice president in April 1999.

Disneytoon Studios

In a  reorganization of Disney, Disney MovieToons/Disney Video Premieres was transferred from Walt Disney Television Animation to Walt Disney Feature Animation and renamed Disneytoon Studios (DTS) in June. Morrill continued to lead the division as executive vice president. With the split, both Disneytoon and Disney Television Animation were issuing direct to video features.

Disney closed Disney Animation Japan, one of the two remaining internal overseas studios Disneytoon worked with, in June 2004, with Pooh's Heffalump Movie (2005) as its final DTS work. By , Morrill was promoted to president of Disneytoon. On , Disney announced that it was closing Disneytoon Studios Australia in October 2006 after 17 years of existence, with its final feature being Cinderella III: A Twist in Time (2007).

In the early 2000s, Disneytoon joined Disney Consumer Products (DCP) as their internal video partner within the Disney conglomerate in developing the new Disney franchises, which then only consisted of Disney Princess and Disney Fairies. While DCP eyed other potential franchises, DTS looked into the Seven Dwarfs for a male-centric franchise to counterbalance the female-centric Fairies by 2005.

John Lasseter joined Disney with the purchase of Pixar in 2006, and made it known that he disliked Disneytoon's sequels and prequels, as he felt that they were undercutting the value of the original feature films. Following complications relating to the production of Tinker Bell (2008), the debut film of DCP's Fairies franchise, it led to discussions over the focus of the division. Thus, Sharon Morrill, president of the studio, moved to a new position in the company. On June 22, 2007, management of Disneytoon Studios was turned over to the control of Alan Bergman, president of Walt Disney Studios, with input from Ed Catmull and Lasseter. As chief creative officer, Lasseter called for the cancellation of all future films in production or development at Disneytoon Studios. As a result, planned or in-progress sequels to Pinocchio (1940), Dumbo (1941), The Aristocats (1970), Chicken Little (2005), and Meet the Robinsons (2007) were all cancelled, among other projects. Tinker Bells animation was scrapped and was restarted while two projects that DCP formed as franchise projects were canceled, which were "Disney's Dwarfs" and the Disney Princess Enchanted Tales line after the latter's first DVD. The release of The Little Mermaid 3 was put on hold. Disney Studios president Alan Bergman went to oversee day-to-day operations of DTS. Thus DTS halted production of sequels and prequels when it originally indicated that the division would shift to support various Playhouse Disney franchises with direct-to-videos.

At the April unveiling of Disney's animated feature lineup, it was announced that Disneytoon Studios would no longer produce future sequels to Disney animated films, but will instead focus on spin-offs. Also, the division was under the banner of the renamed Walt Disney Feature Animation studio, now called Walt Disney Animation Studios, led by Catmull and Lasseter.

In November 2017, Lasseter announced that he would be taking a six-month leave of absence after acknowledging what he called "missteps" in his behavior with employees in a memo addressed to the staff of Disneytoon Studios, Walt Disney Animation Studios, and Pixar. According to The Hollywood Reporter and The Washington Post, Lasseter had a history of alleged sexual misconduct towards employees. On June 8, 2018, it was announced that Lasseter would leave Disney Animation and Pixar at the end of the year, but would take on a consulting role until then.

Disneytoon Studios closed on June 28, 2018, resulting in a layoff of 75 animators and staff. As a result, the studio's third Planes film about the future of aviation in outer space was removed from both Disney's film release date schedule of April 12, 2019 and from development.

Since 2019, the studio building has been used as a third building for new productions for Disney Television Animation with former Disneytoon Studios general manager Roberts being promoted new CEO at Disney Television Animation after the departure of long-time CEO Eric Coleman on 2019.

Filmography

Feature films
As of 2002, the films that Disneytoon had made often had budgets less than $15 million for production, and had taken in $100 million in sales and rentals.

Television specials

Short films

See also
List of Disney home entertainment

References

1990 establishments in California
American companies established in 1990
Mass media companies established in 1990
American animation studios
2018 disestablishments in California
Companies based in Glendale, California
Disney production studios
Walt Disney Studios (division)
Walt Disney Animation Studios
Mass media companies disestablished in 2018
Film studios